Filip Blažek (born 11 March 1998) is a Slovak footballer who plays for Skalica.

Career

FK Senica
Blažek made his professional debut for Senica against AS Trenčín on 23 July 2016.

Brøndby IF
On 11 July 2017, Brøndby announced they had reached an agreement with Senica for the transfer of Blažek, after he had impressed on a tryout. Blažek signed a three-year contract, receiving the number 26 shirt. 

Blažek made his first league appearance for Brøndby on 1 March 2018 against Midtjylland replacing Simon Tibbling in the stoppage time.

Skalica
On 25 January 2019 Skalica announced, that they had signed Blažek from Brøndby on loan for the rest of the season. Brøndby announced on 19 July 2019, that they had sold Blažek permanently to Skalica.

Honours
Brøndby IF
Danish Cup: 2017–18

References

External links
 Eurofotbal profile
  
 Futbalnet Profile

1998 births
Living people
Slovak footballers
Slovakia youth international footballers
Association football midfielders
FK Senica players
Brøndby IF players
MFK Skalica players
Slovak Super Liga players
Danish Superliga players
Expatriate men's footballers in Denmark
Place of birth missing (living people)